Francine Battaglia is an American aerospace engineer specializing in computational fluid dynamics, including the study of fluidized beds and of fire, fire whirls, and flame spread. Her other research interests include ventilation and energy usage in architectural design, and alternative and renewable energy systems. She is professor and chair in the Department of Mechanical and Aerospace Engineering of the University at Buffalo, where she directs the Computational Research for Energy Systems and Transport Laboratory.

Education and career
Battaglia studied mechanical engineering at the University at Buffalo, graduating in 1991 and continuing there for a master's degree in aerospace engineering in 1992. She completed her Ph.D. in mechanical engineering at Pennsylvania State University in 1997.

After working as a lecturer at Pennsylvania State University and a postdoctoral researcher at the National Institute of Standards and Technology, she became an assistant professor at Iowa State University in 1999, and was tenured as an associate professor in 2005, also becoming director of the university's Center for Building Energy Research. She moved to Virginia Tech in 2007, and returned to the University at Buffalo as a professor in 2017. She became chair of mechanical and aerospace engineering in 2020.

She chaired the Fluids Engineering Division of the American Society of Mechanical Engineers (ASME) for 2013. She has been editor-in-chief of the ASME Journal of Fluids Engineering since 2017.

Books
Battaglia is coauthor of Designing Spaces for Natural Ventilation: An Architect's Guide (with U. Passe, Taylor & Francis, 2015). She is coeditor of Modeling and Simulation of Turbulent Mixing and Reaction For Power, Energy and Flight (with Livescu, Nouri, and Givi, Springer, 2020).

Recognition
Battaglia was named a Fellow of the ASME in 2009, and a Fellow of the American Society of Thermal and Fluids Engineers (ASTFE), "for fundamental contributions to the science and technology of building energy utilization and renewable/alternative energy, and turbulent multiphase and reacting flows; exemplary contributions in research, education and service to the thermal and fluids engineering fields; and through distinguished leadership within ASTFE and ASME", in 2019.

References

External links
Home page

Year of birth missing (living people)
Living people
American aerospace engineers
American women engineers
Fluid dynamicists
University at Buffalo alumni
Pennsylvania State University alumni
Iowa State University faculty
Virginia Tech faculty
University at Buffalo faculty
Fellows of the American Society of Mechanical Engineers